The 1935 Creighton Bluejays football team was an American football team that represented Creighton University as a member of the Missouri Valley Conference (MVC) during the 1935 college football season. In its first season under head coach Marchmont Schwartz, the team compiled a 3–5–1 record (2–2–1 against MVC opponents) and was outscored by a total of 112 to 58. The team played its home games at Creighton Stadium in Omaha, Nebraska.

Schedule

References

Creighton
Creighton Bluejays football seasons
Creighton Bluejays football